Dahej is a cargo port situated on the South-west coast of Gujarat, India in Bharuch district. There is 17.5 million tonnes per year capacity LNG terminal operated by Petronet in Dahej.

Port Information

General
The Port of Dahej is located in the Gulf of Cambay, at the junction of Guljaria and Ban Creek. It is a natural deep water port accommodating vessels of draft up to 25m.  It is about 45 kilometers from Bharuch, which is now being connected to the Port of Dahej by a broad gauge rail siding with an initial capacity of 25-30 rakes a day. The nearest airports are at Ahmedabad, Surat and Baroda.

A deep draft multi cargo berthing facility is being proposed with a 3.5 km waterfront, to develop the port according to the directions of the Gujarat Maritime Board.  In addition to this there are four other port facilities at Dahej, owned by Petronet LNG Limited (including a bulk terminal sub-concessioned to Adani), GCPTCL,ONGC OPAL, Birla Copper, Torrent Pharmaceuticals and Reliance Industries.

Chart 
Indian Naval Hydrograph - 2082
Dahej Harbour & Admiralty Chart :- 51

Communication 
VHF Channel 16, 11, 12, 14 for working & marine band
Call sign:- DHIL JETTY OR CONTROLL
FREE PRATIQUE	:- normally issued by customs boarding officer
BSNL is providing the landline and broadband services in the area, recently WiMAX service has also been launched in the PCPIR region.

Meteorological data 

Highest Astronomical Tide (HAT):- 10.800 m
Highest High Water Spring (HHWS):- +10.200 m
Mean High Water Spring  (MHWS):- 8.800 m
Mean High Water Neap (MHWN):-  7.10 m
Mean Sea Level (MSL):-  +5.100 m
Mean Low Water Spring (MLWS):- +0.900 m
Mean Low Water Neap (MLWN):- +1.800 m
Lowest Low Water Spring (LLWS):- +0.700 m
Lowest Astronomical Tide (LAT):- -1.000 m

Anchorage 
Vessels calling at the port can anchor at a distance of 5.5 km from the Gujarat Maritime Board Old Port and about 6.5 km from Jageshwar IPCL Jetty. The draft available is up to 25m. During high tide, the water levels rise by up to 10 - 11m.

Pilotage 
Pilots are not required; however, the services of a local guide are provided on request.

Restrictions 
As the port is a direct berthing port, there is a restriction with respect to LOA, beam or draft based on the size of berth. While capacity is being augmented, the current berthing restrictions for LOA/beam/draft are 270m/38m/17m respectively.

Port estate 
Dahej Port has captive jetties and a private port used by DHIL, Petronet LNG, GCPTCL, IPCL.

Cargo handling 
The Petronet LNG jetty is a dedicated deep water facility for import of LNG. One berth is already operating and another is under construction. Another bulk handling facility is available to the north of this facility for unloading various bulk cargoes at the rate of 30,000 tons per day. Two such berths are available for berthing. A dedicated liquid handling facility owned by GCPTCL (Gujarat Chemical Port Terminal Company Limited), which handles liquid cargoes with unloading / loading rates up to 25000 tonnes per day. A captive facility for handling Copper Ore and Sulphuric Acid is being owned and operated by Birla Copper for handling its own cargoes. The immediate hinterland is currently undergoing phase development with the Dahej, a Special Economic Zone being developed over an area of 30,000 hectares. While the current four-lane connecting highway is being expanded to a six-lane highway, the rail corridor is also being developed to a broad gauge line with individual sidings being offered to the major prospect users in the area.

Commodities 
Import: Coal, Chemicals, LNG, Rock Phosphate, Urea(proposed), Container(proposed)
Export: POL, Chemicals
Other facilities: crew change, store supplies, repairs, fresh water, bunkers

References

Geography of Gujarat
Dahej
Bharuch district